LPRng is an open-source printing system compatible with the Berkeley printing system and implemented by many open-source Unix-like operating systems. It provides printer spooling and network print server functionality using the Line Printer Daemon protocol.

It was abandoned by its author in early 2005, then picked back up by new developers in October 2006 and hosted on SourceForge.

The latest release is 3.9, which was made available on  May 15, 2019.

See also 

Common Unix Printing System (CUPS)
System V printing system

References

External links 

Original LPRng website
LPRng lpinfo web interface

Computer printing